Harold Stanford (31 May 1899 – 1975) was an English professional football goalkeeper who appeared in the Football League for Coventry City and Brentford.

Career statistics

References

English footballers
English Football League players
Brentford F.C. players
Footballers from Birmingham, West Midlands
Association football goalkeepers
Walsall F.C. players
Brierley Hill Alliance F.C. players
Coventry City F.C. players
Southend United F.C. players
Bristol Rovers F.C. players
1899 births
1975 deaths